Martin Šulek (born 15 January 1998) is a Slovak professional footballer who plays as a defender for Ekstraklasa side Wisła Płock.

Club career
Šulek made his Fortuna Liga debut for AS Trenčín against Slovan Bratislava on 20 September 2015.

International career
Šulek was first called up for the Slovakia national team's two unofficial friendly fixtures in January 2017 against Uganda and Sweden. He marked his debut on 8 January 2017 in a match against Uganda, playing the first half, before being substituted for Juraj Kotula at the beginning of the second half. Slovakia went on to lose the game 3–1. Šulek also played an entire match against Sweden on 12 January, in a 6–0 defeat.

References

External links
 AS Trenčín official club profile
 Futbalnet profile
 
 Fortuna Liga profile

1998 births
Living people
Sportspeople from Trenčín
Slovak footballers
Slovakia international footballers
Slovakia under-21 international footballers
Association football defenders
AS Trenčín players
ŠKF Sereď players
Wisła Płock players
Slovak Super Liga players
Ekstraklasa players
Slovak expatriate footballers
Expatriate footballers in Poland
Slovak expatriate sportspeople in Poland